Syniukha is a river in Ukraine, a left tributary of the Southern Bug, the basin of Black Sea. Its name means blue or of blue shade. It is formed at the confluence of its source rivers Tikych (itself formed at the confluence of the Hnyly Tikych and the Hirsky Tikych) and Velyka Vys. It flows into the Southern Bug at Pervomaysk.

It is believed that in the mid 14th century here took place one of major battles between the Grand Duchy of Lithuania and the Ulus Jochi, the Battle of Blue Waters.

References

 Географічна енциклопедія України: в 3-х томах / Редколегія: О. М. Маринич (відпов. ред.) та ін. — К.: «Українська радянська енциклопедія» імені М. П. Бажана, 1989.

Rivers of Kirovohrad Oblast
Rivers of Mykolaiv Oblast